My Favorite Time of the Year is a studio album by American singer Dionne Warwick. It was released by DMI Records on October 26, 2004 in the United States. Produced by Tena Rix Clark, it is her first Christmas album and her only record to be solely released by DMI. My Favorite Time of the Year consists of thirteen tracks, featuring one original song penned and recorded with Bebe Winans and twelve cover versions of Christmas standards and carols, one of which is a duet with Gladys Knight. The album debuted and peaked at number 49 on the US Top Holiday Albums.

Critical reception

Allmusic editor Rob Theakston wrote that Warwick's "velvety smooth voice glazes through each track quite seamlessly. The contemporary over polished production and the inclusion of smooth jazz icon Dave Koz might be a detraction to some listeners, but there's a beautiful duet with longtime friend Gladys Knight [...] Much like her non-holiday fare, this is a charming and warm affair from start to finish a level of quality you'd come to expect from Warwick. While it's definitely been worth the wait, here's hoping a follow-up is shortly in order."

Track listing 
All tracks produced by Tena Rix Clark.

Charts

Release history

References 

Dionne Warwick albums
2004 Christmas albums